Herbert J 'Willie' Hales was a male English international table tennis player.

Table tennis career
He represented England during the 1934 World Table Tennis Championships in the Swaythling Cup (men's team event) with Eric Findon, Don Foulis, Ken Hyde and Andrew Millar.

See also
 List of England players at the World Team Table Tennis Championships

References

English male table tennis players